Saint Hill Green is a small village near East Grinstead, West Sussex, England.

It is notable for two country houses in the vicinity: Standen, designed by the architect Philip Webb in the Arts and Crafts style and now a National Trust property, and the 1792-built Saint Hill Manor, which had several notable owners before having been purchased by L. Ron Hubbard and becoming one of the international centres for the Church of Scientology, which he founded.

External links 

 Map of Saint Hill and vicinity (Google Maps)
 Map of Saint Hill and vicinity (Multimap.com)

Mid Sussex District
Villages in West Sussex